Derradji Harek (born 19 December 1959) represented Algeria in the 800m and the  1500mat the 1980 Summer Olympic Games, he qualified for the semi-final in the 800m where he finished 8th.

References

1959 births
Living people
Athletes (track and field) at the 1980 Summer Olympics
Olympic athletes of Algeria
Algerian male middle-distance runners
Place of birth missing (living people)
21st-century Algerian people
20th-century Algerian people